The Copenhagen Royal Chapel Choir is one of Scandinavia's oldest choral foundations that is richly steeped in tradition.

The high artistic standard which has characterized the choir for 90 years has been achieved by means of the unique vocal training the choristers receive at Sankt Annæ Gymnasium (St. Anne's Gymnasium), the Copenhagen Municipal Choir School, and from the choir's duties at Copenhagen Cathedral (The Church of Our Lady).

The choir has gained an international reputation through its interpretation of the works of the major composers of the renaissance and baroque eras in particular of 20th-century choral music for boys' and men's voices. Copenhagen Royal Chapel Choir gives a considerable number of concerts in Denmark and all over the world.

History
Copenhagen Royal Chapel Choir was founded by Mogens Wöldike in 1924 after a visit to Copenhagen by the famous Thomanerchor, the boys' choir of St. Thomas Church, Leipzig, Bach's own choir. From the start the aim of the choir was to perform choral music written for boys' and men's voices from the Middle Ages to the 20th century. On Carl Nielsen's warmest recommendation the City Council of Copenhagen in 1929 established a Choir School for the boys, the present Sankt Annæ Gymnasium. In this way, the members of the choir were guaranteed a comprehensive, thorough vocal training and musical education as an integral part of their school curriculum.

Each year Sankt Annæ Gymnasium recruits new pupils with vocal and musical ability from eight-year-old school children in and around Copenhagen.

Today the Choir School also houses Sankt Annæ Pigekor (Copenhagen Girls' Choir) and Sankt Annæ Gymnasiekor (St. Anne's Youth Choir).

Until 1959 Copenhagen Royal Chapel Choir was permanently attached to Christiansborg Slotskirke (The Chapel of Christiansborg Castle), but since then the choir has been giving regular concerts every Friday evening in Copenhagen Cathedral throughout the main season, and the boys have also been singing at High Mass and Vespers in the cathedral. Because of its connection with both Sankt Annæ Gymnasium and Copenhagen Cathedral the choir is the oldest representative in Scandinavia of something as fundamental in European choral music as the Cathedral School Tradition.

The Boys of Our Lady's Church flourished especially in the 16th and 17th centuries when they were also part of the Copenhagen Royal Chapel Choir. The richness of this period's musical life is also reflected in the repertoire of the Boys' Choir at the present time.

Present
In the same way, Copenhagen Royal Chapel Choir today often performs in connection with the Royal Family's major festivities, at State Visits abroad as well as at many other official arrangements and cultural campaigns of significance. Since 1998 the choir, with the permission of Her Majesty the Queen, has been able to append the title Copenhagen Royal Chapel Choir to its name, and in accordance with the choir's traditions, this title is now its English name.

Over the years, the choir has gained a reputation for being one of the finest of its type and it has given concerts in all parts of the world and at innumerable international music festivals. Its repertoire is comprehensive, ranging from commissioned works by leading composers of our time (Poul Ruders, Bernhard Lewkovitch, Per Nørgaard, Vagn Holmboe and Palle Mikkelborg) back to the earliest polyphony.

The choir has also taken part in productions for radio and television both in Denmark and in other countries, and the many CDs which the choir has made on labels such as EMI, Decca, Vanguard, Chandos, Kontrapunkt and Danica Records (OH) have all contributed to its distinguished international reputation.

Since 1991 Ebbe Munk has been the choir's artistic and administrative director.

In 2003, the Copenhagen Royal Chapel Choir was awarded the Liliane Bettencourt Choral Singing Prize in partnership with the Académie des beaux-arts. This award honours the choir's quality musical output in keeping with Scandinavian choral tradition.

The school
Copenhagen City Council offers all nine-year-old children who are able to sing and who enjoy doing so the opportunity of being admitted to the Choir School, which is accordingly not a private school, even though many think that it is.

Here children can continue their normal schooling and, at the same time, receive intensive vocal training. They encounter a large, flourishing school where everyday life is marked by the pupils' occupation with choral singing and music, but also by versatility in a school community with many committed children and parents. The children quickly get used to the change from a local school to the Choir School. A special arrangement to help new pupils to acclimatize themselves enables the school to tackle problems connected with a change of school at an early stage. They are usually of a practical nature and easy to solve.

References

Sankt Annæ Gymnasium
Boys' and men's choirs
Choirs of children
Danish musical groups
Musical groups established in 1924